Evelyn Lambart (July 23, 1914 – April 3, 1999) was a Canadian animator and film director with the National Film Board of Canada, known for her independent work, and for her collaborations with Norman McLaren.

Early years
Born in Ottawa, she was hearing impaired from an early age, which she later credited with focusing her attention on the visual world as a means of communication. After attending Lisgar Collegiate Institute in Ottawa, Lambart studied at the Ontario College of Art for five years, graduating in 1937. Her plan had been to continue her art studies in the U.K., however, the outbreak of Second World War made that impossible. Instead, Lambart spent a year and a half working with Grace Melvin on illuminations and lettering for the first Books of Remembrance, commemorating Canadian war dead in the First World War (now on display at St. Paul's Cathedral).

NFB career
In 1942, due to an ever-growing demand for animation, NFB commissioner John Grierson asked McLaren to form an animation unit and, in January 1943, 'Studio A' formally came into existence. Lambart was one of McLaren's first recruits and the first female animator hired by the board. She would also train other animators; both Colin Low and Robert Verrall credited her with teaching them their animation skills. 

Lambart and McLaren were an immediate and permanent fit; she was methodical and pragmatic, he was a creative 'dreamer'. In 1949, they co-directed Begone Dull Care, which was designated as a "masterwork" by the Audio-Visual Preservation Trust of Canada. She did animation for McLaren and Claude Jutra's pixilation film A Chairy Tale, and for several other ground-breaking films, many of which she co-directed or directed, including Rythmetic (1956), Lines: Vertical (1960), Lines: Horizontal" (1962), and Mosaic (1965).

In its 1999 obituary for Lambart, Animation World Network stated that:

These animated morality tales for children included several adaptations of Aesop's fables, and were all rendered with the same style of paper cut-outs transferred to lithograph plates, painted and animated.

In 1978, she was the subject of the biographical documentary Eve Lambart directed by Margaret Wescott.

Her last known film, The Town Mouse and the Country Mouse (1980), was completed at her home studio in Quebec's Eastern Townships after her retirement in 1977. She died in Ottawa in 1999.

Honours
Lambart was awarded a posthumous Winsor McCay Award in 2022.

FilmographyStory of a Violin - documentary short, Jacques Bobet 1947 - co-animator with Norman McLarenThe Impossible Map - documentary short, 1947 - animator, directorBegone Dull Care - experimental short, 1949 - editor, co-animator and co-director with Norman McLarenFamily Tree - animated short, 1950 - co-director and co-animator with George DunningChallenge: Science Against Cancer - documentary short, Morten Parker 1950 - co-animator with Colin LowThe Fight: Science Against Cancer - documentary short, Morten Parker 1950 - co-animator with Colin LowThe Outlaw Within - documentary short, Morten Parker 1951 - co-animator with Colin LowNow is the Time - experimental, Norman McLaren 1951 - co-producerAround Is Around - experimental short, Norman McLaren 1951 - co-animator with Norman McLarenSing a Little - animated short, Tom Daly 1951 - co-animator with Jean-Paul LadouceurO Canada - experimental short, 1952 - animator, directorThe Maple Leaf - documentary short, J.V. Durden 1955 - co-animator with Robert VerrallThe Colour of Life - documentary short, J.V. Durden 1955 - co-animator with Robert VerrallRythmetic - animated short, 1956 - photography, co-director and co-animator with Norman McLarenPutting It Straight - documentary short, William Greaves 1957 - co-animator with Sidney GoldsmithA Chairy Tale - experimental short, Norman McLaren and Claude Jutra 1957 - animator Le Merle - animated short, Norman McLaren 1958 - co-animator with Norman McLarenShort and Suite - experimental short, 1959 - co-animator with Norman McLarenLines: Vertical - experimental short, 1960 - co-animator and co-director with Norman McLaren Les femmes parmi nous - La dignité - documentary short, Jacques Bobet 1961 - co-animator with Arthur LipsettLes femmes parmi nous - Le bonheur - documentary short, Jacques Bobet 1961 - co-animator with Arthur LipsettLines: Horizontal - experimental short, 1962 - co-animator and co-director with Norman McLaren Mosaic - experimental short, 1965 - co-animator and co-director with Norman McLaren The Hoarder - animated short, 1969 - animator, directorThe Embryonic Development of Fish - documentary short, J.V. Durden 1961 - animatorFine Feathers - animated short, 1968 - animator, directorParadise Lost - animated short, 1970 - animator, directorThe Story of Christmas - animated short, 1974 - animator, directorMr. Frog Went A-Courting - animated short, 1974 - animator, directorThe Lion and the Mouse - animated short, 1976 - animator, director The Town Mouse and the Country Mouse - animated short, 1980 - animator, director

AwardsBegone Dull Care (1949)
 Venice Film Festival, Venice: First Prize, Art Films, 1950
 2nd Canadian Film Awards, Ottawa: Special Award, Experimentation, 1950
 Salerno Film Festival, Salerno, Italy: Honourable Mention, Miscellaneous Film, 1950
 Berlin International Film Festival, Berlin: Silver Medal, Documentary Short Film, 1951
 American Federation of Arts and Film Advisory Center Film Festival, Woodstock, New York: Best Experimental Film, 1952
 Durban International Film Festival, Durban: First Place, Silver Medal, Experimental, 1954Family Tree (1950) 
 Salerno Film Festival, Salerno: First Prize – Grand Award, Best of All Entries, 1951
 3rd Canadian Film Awards, Ottawa: Special Award for Outstanding Animation and Musical Score, 1951
 Rapallo International Film Festival, Rapallo: Second Prize, Art Films, 1957Now is the Time (1951)
 4th Canadian Film Awards, Special Award for Experimental Filmmaking, 1952 (with Around Is Around)Around Is Around (1951)
 BFI London Film Festival, London: Nominee: Best Animation, 1957
 4th Canadian Film Awards, Special Award for Experimental Filmmaking, 1952 (with Now is the Time)Rythmetic (1956)
 6th Berlin International Film Festival, Berlin: Silver Bear, Short Films, 1956
 Edinburgh International Film Festival, Edinburgh: Diploma of Merit, 1956
 Rapallo International Film Festival, Rapallo, Italy: First Prize, Abstract Films, 1957
 International Review of Specialized Cinematography, Rome: Diploma of Honour, 1957
 Chicago Festival of Contemporary Arts, University of Illinois Chicago: First Prize 1957
 Golden Reel International Film Festival, Film Council of America, New York: Silver Reel Award, Avant-Garde and Experimental, 1957
 Durban International Film Festival, Durban: Certificate of Merit, 1957
 Johannesburg International Film Festival, Johannesburg: Certificate of Merit, 1957Lines: Vertical (1960)
 Venice Film Festival, Venice: First Prize, Experimental, 1960
 BFI London Film Festival, London: Outstanding Film of the Year for Presentation, 1960
 Edinburgh International Film Festival, Edinburgh: Diploma of Merit, 1960
 CIDALC Festival of Music and Dance in Film, Valencia: First Prize, 1961
 13th Canadian Film Awards, Toronto: Best Film, Arts and Experimental, 1961Mosaic (1965)
 Vancouver International Film Festival, Vancouver: Certificate of Merit, 1965
 FIBA International Festival of Buenos Aires, Buenos Aires: First Prize, 1966
 Melbourne Film Festival, Melbourne: First Prize, 1966
 American Film and Video Festival, New York: Blue Ribbon, 1966
 Calvin Workshop Awards, Kansas City, Missouri: Notable Film Award, 1966The Hoarder (1969)
 International Festival of Films for Children and Young Adults, Tehran: Plaque and Diploma, 1970
 FIBA International Festival of Buenos Aires, Buenos Aires: Honorable Mention, Animation, 1970
 Tisquesusa Dorado International Festival of Short Films, Bogotá: Best Animated Film, 1971
 American Film and Video Festival, New York: Blue Ribbon, 1971Paradise Lost'' (1970) 
 National Educational Media Network Competition, Oakland, California: Don Fabun Award for Film as Art, 1972

References

External links
Watch films by Evelyn Lambart at NFB.ca (Requires Adobe Flash)

1914 births
1999 deaths
Artists from Ottawa
Canadian animators
Canadian women animators
National Film Board of Canada people
OCAD University alumni
Canadian women film directors
Film directors from Ottawa
Deaf film directors
Manuscript illuminators
Stop motion animators
Drawn-on-film animators
Deaf artists
Canadian deaf people
Lisgar Collegiate Institute alumni